John Francis Meier (born 1964) is a United States Navy rear admiral who has served as the Commander of Naval Air Force Atlantic since May 1, 2020. Previously, he was Commander of Navy Warfare Development Command from July 3, 2019, to May 18, 2020.

Born at Aberdeen Proving Ground, Maryland and raised in Export, Pennsylvania, Meier is a 1982 graduate of Franklin Regional High School. He then attended the United States Naval Academy, graduating in 1986 with a B.S. degree in general engineering. In August 1988, Meier completed flight training in Beeville, Texas and became a naval aviator.

Meier married Rachel Diane Edwards on December 5, 1990 in Island County, Washington. The couple have two sons.

References

External links

1964 births
Living people
United States Naval Academy alumni
Military personnel from Pennsylvania
United States Naval Aviators
Recipients of the Legion of Merit
United States Navy admirals